Justin Ring (born July 4, 1973) is a former Canadian football linebacker who played seven seasons in the Canadian Football League with the Hamilton Tiger-Cats and Edmonton Eskimos. He was drafted by the Hamilton Tiger-Cats in the first round of the 1996 CFL Draft. Ring played college football at Simon Fraser University. He was the Hamilton Tiger-Cats Most Outstanding Rookie in 1996.

References

External links
Just Sports Stats
1996 CFL Draft
Fanbase profile

1973 births
Living people
Canadian football linebackers
Edmonton Elks players
Hamilton Tiger-Cats players
Players of Canadian football from British Columbia
Simon Fraser Clan football players
Sportspeople from Kamloops